Oakdale High School may refer to:

 Oakdale High School (Maryland) in Frederick, Maryland
 Oakdale High School (California) in Oakdale, California
 Oakdale High School (Louisiana) in Oakdale, Louisiana
 Oakdale High School (Tennessee) in Oakdale, Tennessee